São José do Barreiro (São José in Portuguese means Saint Joseph) is a municipality in the eastern part of the state of São Paulo, Brazil.
The population is 4,144 (2020 est.) in an area of 570.69 km².

Location

São José do Barreiro is in the microregion of Bananal. Both to the north and south it borders the state of Rio de Janeiro. 
It is part of the Metropolitan Region of Vale do Paraíba e Litoral Norte.
The municipality contains part of the  Mananciais do Rio Paraíba do Sul Environmental Protection Area, created in 1982 to protect the sources of the Paraíba do Sul river.
The southern part of the municipality is part of the Serra da Bocaina National Park. Its main industries are cattle and tourism.

Population history

References

External links
  http://www.saojosedobareiro.sp.gov.br
  citybrazil.com.br
  São José do Barreiro on Explorevale
  Guia Vale do Paraíba - O que fazer em São José do Barreiro

Municipalities in São Paulo (state)